Alexander Hanson may refer to:

* Alexander Contee Hanson, American lawyer, publisher, and statesman
 A. M. Hanson (Alexander Mark Hanson, born 1969), artist and photographer
 Alexander Hanson (actor) (born 1961), British actor
 Alexander Contee Hanson Sr. (1749–1806), attorney and chancellor of Maryland